2005 World Championships may refer to:

 Alpine skiing: Alpine World Ski Championships 2005
 Aquatics: 2005 World Aquatics Championships
 Athletics: 2005 World Championships in Athletics
Cross-country running: 2005 IAAF World Cross Country Championships
Road running: 2005 IAAF World Half Marathon Championships
 Badminton: 2005 IBF World Championships
 Bandy: Bandy World Championship 2005
 Biathlon: Biathlon World Championships 2005
 Boxing: 2005 World Amateur Boxing Championships
 Chess: FIDE World Chess Championship 2005
 Curling:
 2005 World Men's Curling Championship
 2005 World Women's Curling Championship
 Darts: 2005 BDO World Darts Championship
 Darts: 2005 PDC World Darts Championship
 Figure skating: 2005 World Figure Skating Championships
 Ice hockey: 2005 Men's World Ice Hockey Championships
 Ice hockey: 2005 Women's World Ice Hockey Championships
 Nordic skiing: FIS Nordic World Ski Championships 2005
 Snooker: 2005 World Snooker Championship
 Speed skating:
Allround: 2005 World Allround Speed Skating Championships
Sprint: 2005 World Sprint Speed Skating Championships
Single distances: 2005 World Single Distance Speed Skating Championships
 Weightlifting: 2005 World Weightlifting Championships

See also
 2005 World Cup (disambiguation)
 2005 Continental Championships (disambiguation)
 2005 World Junior Championships (disambiguation)